Donald Henry Gips (born February 1, 1960) is the CEO of the Skoll Foundation. He is a former U.S. Ambassador to the Republic of South Africa from 2009 to 2013. Ambassador Gips was appointed by President Barack Obama on June 4 and confirmed by the Senate on July 7, 2009. He presented his credentials to South African President Jacob Zuma on October 1, 2009. He served until January 2, 2013.

In February 2019, Gips was announced as the incoming CEO of the Skoll Foundation, taking over for the retired Sally Osberg. He began as CEO on April 9, 2019, at the annual Skoll World Forum on Social Entrepreneurship. 

Previously he was a principal at Albright Stonebridge Group, a global strategic advisory firm. He also leads the firm's Africa practice. 

Previously he was the Divisional Vice President of Corporate Strategy and Development for Level 3 Communications and Director of Mindspeed Technologies. He was also on the advisory board for President Barack Obama's presidential transition team.

In the late 1990s Gips served as Vice President Al Gore's Chief Domestic Policy Advisor. Previously, he was the chief of the Federal Communications Commission's international bureau.

He is married to Elizabeth Berry and has three children: Sam, Peter and Ben.
  
Gips is a graduate of Princeton Day School, Harvard College, and the Yale School of Management.

References

External links

 U.S. Department of State Biography
Donald Henry Gips - People - Department History - Office of the Historian Donald Henry Gips (1960–)]

1960 births
Living people
Harvard College alumni
Yale School of Management alumni
American political consultants
Ambassadors of the United States to South Africa
Princeton Day School alumni